This Woman is the second studio album by American country music artist K. T. Oslin. It was released by RCA Records in August 1988. "Money", "Hold Me", "Hey Bobby", the title track and "Didn't Expect It to Go Down This Way" were released as singles. The album reached #2 on the Top Country Albums chart and has been certified Platinum by the RIAA.

Track listing
All songs written or co-written by K. T. Oslin; co-writers in parentheses.
"This Woman"
"Money"
"Round the Clock Lovin'" (Rory Bourke)
"Where Is a Woman to Go" (Jerry Gillespie)
"Hold Me"
"Hey Bobby"
"She Don't Talk Like Us No More"
"Jealous"
"Didn't Expect It to Go Down This Way"
"Truly Blue"

Personnel
Adapted from liner notes

Acoustic Guitar: Brent Rowan
Background Vocals: K.T. Oslin, Joe Scaife
Bass guitar: Mike Brignardello, Larry Paxton
Drums: Eddie Bayers, Owen Hale, James Stroud
Electric Guitar: Mitch Watkins, Brent Rowan
Keyboards: David Briggs, K.T Oslin
Lead Vocals: K.T. Oslin
Percussion: Terry McMillan, Farrell Morris
Saxophone: Jim Horn
Synthesizer: David Briggs

Charts

Weekly charts

Year-end charts

References

1988 albums
K. T. Oslin albums
RCA Records albums
Albums produced by Harold Shedd